Hjem til gården 2018 (Home to the Farm 2018) is the second season of the Danish version of The Farm. 14 contestants from across Denmark come to the farm and live like it was 100 years ago. Each week, the head of the farm nominates one person to be in a duel, the nominee then chooses who they'll face off against in one of three challenges. The person who loses the duel is sent home but not before writing a letter delivered to the farm stating who the head of farm for the next week is. The winner wins a grand prize of 500,000 kr. The season was filmed in Engestofte, Denmark. The season premiered on 21 March 2018 and concluded on 23 May 2018 where Jannie Bager Kristensen won in the final duel against Lars Jannick Jørgensen to win the grand prize and be crowned the winner of Hjem til gården 2018.

Finishing order
All contestants entered on Day 1.

Future Appearances
Jeppe Deele returned in Hjem til gården 2019 as a fighter competing for a spot to enter the farm.

The game

Notes

References

External links

The Farm (franchise)
Danish television series
2018 Danish television seasons